The Isle of Glass is the first novel in The Hound and the Falcon trilogy by Judith Tarr, published in 1985.

Plot summary
The Isle of Glass is a novel in which the elven hero, Alf, works against civil war and heads on a pilgrimage to Jerusalem.

Reception
Dave Langford reviewed The Isle of Glass for White Dwarf #80, and stated that "Tarr can actually write. Her spare prose and dialogue give a period flavour without the dread excesses of gadzookery. Moreover, she's clearly a member of the Black Lords Anonymous and the Society for the Abolition of Quest Clichés."

Reviews
Review by Faren Miller (1985) in Locus, #289 February 1985
Review by Phyllis J. Day (1985) in Fantasy Review, June 1985

Awards and nominations

References

1985 American novels
1985 debut novels
1985 fantasy novels
American fantasy novels